Bedřich Geminder (19 November 1901, in Vítkovice – 3 December 1952, in Prague)  was Chief of the International Section of the Secretariat of Czechoslovak Communist Party. He was executed together with Rudolf Slánský and others.

References

External links
  Bedřich Geminder (1901–1952)

1901 births
1952 deaths
Politicians from Ostrava
People from the Margraviate of Moravia
Czech Jews
Communist Party of Czechoslovakia politicians
Jewish Czech politicians
Jewish socialists
Executed Czechoslovak people
Executed politicians
People executed by the Czechoslovak Socialist Republic by hanging
Executed Czech people
Czechoslovak Socialist Republic rehabilitations